PoDoFo is a software library and tools to work with the PDF file format. The name comes from the first two letters of each word in PDF's spelled-out form (Portable Document Format).

The PoDoFo library is a free portable C++ library which includes classes to parse a PDF file and modify its contents into memory. PoDoFo includes very simple classes to create PDF files. All classes are documented so it is easy to start writing an application using PoDoFo.

PoDoFo is primarily useful for applications that wish to do lower-level manipulation of PDF, such as extracting content or merging files. It is also useful if an application has specific requirements for its PDF output that more general output-oriented libraries like Cairo cannot satisfy. Canvas/drawing support is currently very limited in PoDoFo, so for pure output tasks a library like Cairo will be more suitable. PoDoFo cannot render PDF, so one should look at a library like Poppler for that.

PoDoFo is dependent on OpenSSL, zlib, freetype2, fontconfig (Unix and Mac OS X only), libjpeg (optional), libpng (optional) and LibTIFF (optional).

PoDoFo is released under the GNU Lesser General Public License (LGPL). The tests and tools which are included in PoDoFo are licensed under the GNU General Public License.

See also 

 List of PDF software

References

External links
 

Free PDF software
Free software programmed in C++
Cross-platform software
C++ libraries